John Carroll High School, located in Fort Pierce, Florida, is a co-ed Catholic high school serving nearly 400 students in grades 9-12.

History
The school originally opened as part of St. Anastasia Catholic School and opened under the name John Carroll High School in 1965 as Diocesan regional high school. The school was named in honor of Pope John XXIII and Bishop Coleman Carroll. It is part of the Roman Catholic Diocese of Palm Beach.

The school serves students from Indian River, St. Lucie, Martin, and Okeechobee counties. It is accredited by Southern Association of Colleges and Schools and holds membership in the National Catholic Education Association.

Academics
John Carroll offers Advanced Placement, dual enrollment, honors, and academic classes. Eight dual enrollment classes are offered on campus through a partnership with Indian River State College, and students can also elect to take additional dual enrollment classes off campus.

References

External links
 

Fort Pierce, Florida
Catholic secondary schools in Florida
High schools in St. Lucie County, Florida
Educational institutions established in 1916
Roman Catholic Diocese of Palm Beach
1916 establishments in Florida